Optimism bias (or the optimistic bias) is a cognitive bias that causes someone to believe that they themselves are less likely to experience a negative event. It is also known as unrealistic optimism or comparative optimism.

Optimism bias is common and transcends gender, ethnicity, nationality, and age. Optimistic biases are even reported in non-human animals such as rats and birds. However, autistic people are less susceptible to optimistic biases.

Four factors can cause a person to be optimistically biased: their desired end state, their cognitive mechanisms, the information they have about themselves versus others, and overall mood. The optimistic bias is seen in a number of situations. For example: people believing that they are less at risk of being a crime victim, smokers believing that they are less likely to contract lung cancer or disease than other smokers, first-time bungee jumpers believing that they are less at risk of an injury than other jumpers, or traders who think they are less exposed to potential losses in the markets.

Although the optimism bias occurs for both positive events (such as believing oneself to be more financially successful than others) and negative events (such as being less likely to have a drinking problem), there is more research and evidence suggesting that the bias is stronger for negative events (the valence effect). Different consequences result from these two types of events: positive events often lead to feelings of well being and self-esteem, while negative events lead to consequences involving more risk, such as engaging in risky behaviors and not taking precautionary measures for safety.

Factors 
The factors leading to the optimistic bias can be categorized into four different groups: desired end states of comparative judgment, cognitive mechanisms, information about the self versus a target, and underlying affect. These are explained more in detail below.

Measuring 
Optimism bias is typically measured through two determinants of risk: absolute risk, where individuals are asked to estimate their likelihood of experiencing a negative event compared to their actual chance of experiencing a negative event (comparison against self), and comparative risk, where individuals are asked to estimate the likelihood of experiencing a negative event (their personal risk estimate) compared to others of the same age and sex (a target risk estimate). Problems can occur when trying to measure absolute risk because it is extremely difficult to determine the actual risk statistic for a person. Therefore, the optimistic bias is primarily measured in comparative risk forms, where people compare themselves against others, through direct and indirect comparisons. Direct comparisons ask whether an individual's own risk of experiencing an event is less than, greater than, or equal to someone else's risk, while indirect comparisons ask individuals to provide separate estimates of their own risk of experiencing an event and others' risk of experiencing the same event.

After obtaining scores, researchers are able to use the information to determine if there is a difference in the average risk estimate of the individual compared to the average risk estimate of their peers. Generally, in negative events, the mean risk of an individual appears lower than the risk estimate of others. This is then used to demonstrate the bias' effect. The optimistic bias can only be defined at a group level, because at an individual level the positive assessment could be true. Likewise, difficulties can arise in measurement procedures, as it is difficult to determine when someone is being optimistic, realistic, or pessimistic. Research suggests that the bias comes from an overestimate of group risks rather than underestimating one's own risk.

An example: participants assigned a higher probability to picking a card that had a smiling face on its reverse side than one which had a frowning face.

Cognitive mechanisms 
The optimistic bias is possibly also influenced by three cognitive mechanisms that guide judgments and decision-making processes: the representativeness heuristic, singular target focus, and interpersonal distance.

Representativeness heuristic 
The estimates of likelihood associated with the optimistic bias are based on how closely an event matches a person's overall idea of the specific event. Some researchers suggest that the representativeness heuristic is a reason for the optimistic bias: individuals tend to think in stereotypical categories rather than about their actual targets when making comparisons. For example, when drivers are asked to think about a car accident, they are more likely to associate a bad driver, rather than just the average driver. Individuals compare themselves with the negative elements that come to mind, rather than an overall accurate comparison between them and another driver. Additionally, when individuals were asked to compare themselves towards friends, they chose more vulnerable friends based on the events they were looking at. Individuals generally chose a specific friend based on whether they resemble a given example, rather than just an average friend. People find examples that relate directly to what they are asked, resulting in representativeness heuristics.

Singular target focus 
One of the difficulties of the optimistic bias is that people know more about themselves than they do about others. While individuals know how to think about themselves as a single person, they still think of others as a generalized group, which leads to biased estimates and inabilities to sufficiently understand their target or comparison group. Likewise, when making judgments and comparisons about their risk compared to others, people generally ignore the average person, but primarily focus on their own feelings and experiences.

Interpersonal distance 
Perceived risk differences occur depending on how far or close a compared target is to an individual making a risk estimate. The greater the perceived distance between the self and the comparison target, the greater the perceived difference in risk. When one brings the comparison target closer to the individual, risk estimates appear closer together than if the comparison target was someone more distant to the participant. There is support for perceived social distance in determining the optimistic bias. Through looking at comparisons of personal and target risk between the in-group level contributes to more perceived similarities than when individuals think about outer-group comparisons which lead to greater perceived differences. In one study, researchers manipulated the social context of the comparison group, where participants made judgements for two different comparison targets: the typical student at their university and a typical student at another university. Their findings showed that not only did people work with the closer comparison first, but also had closer ratings to themselves than the "more different" group.

Studies have also noticed that people demonstrate more optimistic bias when making comparisons when the other is a vague individual, but biases are reduced when the other is a familiar person, such as a friend or family member. This also is determined due to the information they have about the individuals closest to them, but not having the same information about other people.

Desired end states of comparative judgment 
Many explanations for the optimistic bias come from the goals that people want and outcomes they wish to see. People tend to view their risks as less than others because they believe that this is what other people want to see. These explanations include self-enhancement, self-presentation, and perceived control.

Self-enhancement 
Self-enhancement suggests that optimistic predictions are satisfying and that it feels good to think that positive events will happen. People can control their anxiety and other negative emotions if they believe they are better off than others. People tend to focus on finding information that supports what they want to see happen, rather than what will happen to them. With regards to the optimistic bias, individuals will perceive events more favorably, because that is what they would like the outcome to be. This also suggests that people might lower their risks compared to others to make themselves look better than average: they are less at risk than others and therefore better.

Self-presentation 
Studies suggest that people attempt to establish and maintain a desired personal image in social situations. People are motivated to present themselves towards others in a good light, and some researchers suggest that the optimistic bias is a representative of self-presentational processes: people want to appear better off than others. However, this is not through conscious effort. In a study where participants believed their driving skills would be either tested in either real-life or driving simulations, people who believed they were to be tested had less optimistic bias and were more modest about their skills than individuals who would not be tested. Studies also suggest that individuals who present themselves in a pessimistic and more negative light are generally less accepted by the rest of society. This might contribute to overly optimistic attitudes.

Personal control/perceived control 
People tend to be more optimistically biased when they believe they have more control over events than others. For example, people are more likely to think that they will not be harmed in a car accident if they are driving the vehicle. Another example is that if someone believes that they have a lot of control over becoming infected with HIV, they are more likely to view their risk of contracting the disease to be low. Studies have suggested that the greater perceived control someone has, the greater their optimistic bias. Stemming from this, control is a stronger factor when it comes to personal risk assessments, but not when assessing others.

A meta-analysis reviewing the relationship between the optimistic bias and perceived control found that a number of moderators contribute to this relationship. In previous research, participants from the United States generally had higher levels of optimistic bias relating to perceived control than those of other nationalities. Students also showed larger levels of the optimistic bias than non-students. The format of the study also demonstrated differences in the relationship between perceived control and the optimistic bias: direct methods of measurement suggested greater perceived control and greater optimistic bias as compared to indirect measures of the bias. The optimistic bias is strongest in situations where an individual needs to rely heavily on direct action and responsibility of situations.

An opposite factor of perceived control is that of prior experience. Prior experience is typically associated with less optimistic bias, which some studies suggest is from either a decrease in the perception of personal control, or make it easier for individuals to imagine themselves at risk. Prior experience suggests that events may be less controllable than previously believed.

Information about self versus target 
Individuals know a lot more about themselves than they do about others. Because information about others is less available, information about the self versus others leads people to make specific conclusions about their own risk, but results in them having a harder time making conclusions about the risks of others. This leads to differences in judgments and conclusions about self-risks compared to the risks of others, leading to larger gaps in the optimistic bias.

Person-positivity bias 
Person-positivity bias is the tendency to evaluate an object more favorably the more the object resembles an individual human being. Generally, the more a comparison target resembles a specific person, the more familiar it will be. However, groups of people are considered to be more abstract concepts, which leads to less favorable judgments. With regards to the optimistic bias, when people compare themselves to an average person, whether someone of the same sex or age, the target continues to be viewed as less human and less personified, which will result in less favorable comparisons between the self and others.

Egocentric thinking 

"Egocentric thinking" refers to how individuals know more of their own personal information and risk that they can use to form judgments and make decisions. One difficulty, though, is that people have a large amount of knowledge about themselves, but no knowledge about others. Therefore, when making decisions, people have to use other information available to them, such as population data, in order to learn more about their comparison group. This can relate to an optimism bias because while people are using the available information they have about themselves, they have more difficulty understanding correct information about others. 

It is also possible that someone can escape egocentric thinking. In one study, researchers had one group of participants list all factors that influenced their chances of experiencing a variety of events, and then a second group read the list. Those who read the list showed less optimistic bias in their own reports. It's possible that greater knowledge about others and their perceptions of their chances of risk bring the comparison group closer to the participant.

Underestimating average person's control 
Also regarding egocentric thinking, it is possible that individuals underestimate the amount of control the average person has. This is explained in two different ways:
 People underestimate the control that others have in their lives.
 People completely overlook that others have control over their own outcomes.
For example, many smokers believe that they are taking all necessary precautionary measures so that they won't get lung cancer, such as smoking only once a day, or using filtered cigarettes, and believe that others are not taking the same precautionary measures. However, it is likely that many other smokers are doing the same things and taking those same precautions.

Underlying affect 
The last factor of optimistic bias is that of underlying affect and affect experience. Research has found that people show less optimistic bias when experiencing a negative mood, and more optimistic bias when in a positive mood. Sad moods reflect greater memories of negative events, which lead to more negative judgments, while positive moods promote happy memories and more positive feelings. This suggests that overall negative moods, including depression, result in increased personal risk estimates but less optimistic bias overall. Anxiety also leads to less optimistic bias, continuing to suggest that overall positive experiences and positive attitudes lead to more optimistic bias in events.

Health consequences 
In health, the optimistic bias tends to prevent individuals from taking on preventative measures for good health. For example, people who underestimate their comparative risk of heart disease know less about heart disease, and even after reading an article with more information, are still less concerned about risk of heart disease. Because the optimistic bias can be a strong force in decision-making, it is important to look at how risk perception is determined and how this will result in preventative behaviors. Therefore, researchers need to be aware of the optimistic bias and the ways it can prevent people from taking precautionary measures in life choices.

Risk perceptions are particularly important for individual behaviors, such as exercise, diet, and even sunscreen use.

A large portion of risk prevention focuses on adolescents. Especially with health risk perception, adolescence is associated with an increased frequency of risky health-related behaviors such as smoking, drugs, and unsafe sex. While adolescents are aware of the risk, this awareness does not change behavior habits. Adolescents with strong positive optimistic bias toward risky behaviors had an overall increase in the optimistic bias with age.

However, unconditional risk questions in cross-sectional studies are used consistently, leading to problems, as they ask about the likelihood of an action occurring, but does not determine if there is an outcome, or compare events that haven't happened to events that have. 
many times there are methodological problems in these tests. 

Concerning vaccines, perceptions of those who have not been vaccinated are compared to the perceptions of people who have been. Other problems which arise include the failure to know a person's perception of a risk. Knowing this information will be helpful for continued research on optimistic bias and preventative behaviors.

Neurosciences 
Functional neuroimaging suggests a key role for the rostral Anterior Cingulate Cortex (ACC) in modulating both emotional processing and autobiographical retrieval. It is part of brain network showing extensive correlation between rostral ACC and amygdala during imagining of future positive events and restricted correlation during imagining of future negative events. Based on these data, it is suggested that the rostral ACC has a crucial part to play in creating positive images of the future and ultimately, in ensuring and maintaining the optimism bias.

Policy, planning, and management 
Optimism bias influences decisions and forecasts in policy, planning, and management, e.g., the costs and completion times of planned decisions tend to be underestimated and the benefits overestimated due to optimism bias. The term planning fallacy for this effect was first proposed by Daniel Kahneman and Amos Tversky. There is a growing body of evidence proving that optimism bias represents one of the biggest single causes of risk for megaproject overspend.

Valence effect
Valence effect is used to allude to the effect of valence on unrealistic optimism. It has been studied by Ron S. Gold and his team since 2003. They frame questions for the same event in different ways: "some participants were given information about the conditions that promote a given health-related event, such as developing heart disease, and were asked to rate the comparative likelihood that they would experience the event. Other participants were given matched information about the conditions that prevent the same event and were asked to rate the comparative likelihood that they would avoid the event". They have generally found that unrealistic optimism was greater for negative than positive valence.

Valence effects, which is also considered a form of cognitive bias, have several real-world implications. For instance, it can lead to the overestimation of a company's future earnings by investors and this could contribute to a tendency for it to becoming overpriced. In terms of achieving organizational objectives, it could encourage people to produce unrealistic schedules helping drive a so-called planning fallacy, which often result in making poor decisions and project abandonment.

Attempts to alter and eliminate 
Studies have shown that it is very difficult to eliminate the optimistic bias. Some commentators believe that trying to reduce it may encourage people to adapt to health-protective behaviors. However, research has suggested that it cannot be reduced, and that efforts to reduce it tend to lead to even more optimistically biased results. In a research study of four different tests to reduce the optimistic bias, through lists of risk factors, participants perceiving themselves as inferior to others, participants asked to think of high-risk individuals, and giving attributes of why they were at risk, all increased the bias rather than decreased it. Other studies have tried to reduce the bias through reducing distance, but overall it still remains.

This seemingly paradoxical situation – in which an attempt to reduce bias can sometimes actually increase it – may be related to the insight behind the semi-jocular and recursively worded "Hofstadter's law", which states that:

Although research has suggested that it is very difficult to eliminate the bias, some factors may help in closing the gap of the optimistic bias between an individual and their target risk group. First, by placing the comparison group closer to the individual, the optimistic bias can be reduced: studies found that when individuals were asked to make comparisons between themselves and close friends, there was almost no difference in the likelihood of an event occurring. Additionally, actually experiencing an event leads to a decrease in the optimistic bias. While this only applies to events with prior experience, knowing the previously unknown will result in less optimism of it not occurring.

Pessimism bias 
The opposite of optimism bias is pessimism bias (or pessimistic bias), because the principles of the optimistic bias continue to be in effect in situations where individuals regard themselves as worse off than others. Optimism may occur from either a distortion of personal estimates, representing personal optimism, or a distortion for others, representing personal pessimism.

Pessimism bias is an effect in which people exaggerate the likelihood that negative things will happen to them. It contrasts with optimism bias.

People with depression are particularly likely to exhibit pessimism bias. Surveys of smokers have found that their ratings of their risk of heart disease showed a small but significant pessimism bias; however, the literature as a whole is inconclusive.

See also

References

Bibliography

 Taylor, Nigel (2000). Making Actuaries Less Human. Staple Inn Actuarial Society, 15. For picking a card see section 6.2 on page 15.

Further reading

External links 
 "Tali Sharot: The optimism bias", Tali Sharot's talk at TED.com

Cognitive biases
Forecasting
Social psychology